The Great Ace Attorney: Adventures is an adventure game in the Ace Attorney series, developed and published by Capcom. It was directed by Shu Takumi and produced by Shintaro Kojima. The game was released for the Nintendo 3DS in Japan in July 2015, with Android and iOS versions following in August 2017. A sequel, The Great Ace Attorney 2: Resolve, was released in Japan in 2017. Both games were released worldwide in July 2021 via The Great Ace Attorney Chronicles, a compilation for Nintendo Switch, PlayStation 4, and Windows.

Gameplay

The game carries on the courtroom style gameplay of previous installments in the Ace Attorney series, including the fully 3D environments and character models previously featured in Phoenix Wright: Ace Attorney – Dual Destinies. Like previous titles, the game is divided between investigation, in which players explore areas to gather evidence and testimonies, and courtroom battles, in which players must use evidence to find contradictions in witness testimonies to find the truth behind a case. Similarly to Takumi's previous game, Professor Layton vs. Phoenix Wright: Ace Attorney, the player sometimes has to cross-examine multiple witnesses at the same time, potentially gleaning new information by addressing one witness when they react to another's statement. 

The Great Ace Attorney introduces two new gameplay mechanics; The Dance of Deduction and Summation Examinations. During certain investigations, Herlock Sholmes will perform a "Logic and Reasoning Spectacular", in which he will come up with a flawed theory based on observations of the scene and the behavior of witnesses. Players will then have to examine the scene and witnesses carefully in order to correct Herlock's mistakes and reach a more logical conclusion. Summation Examinations take place during trials in which the jury, an aspect of trials in England, will unanimously decide on a guilty verdict. At these points, the player has to convince a majority of the jury to change their verdict so that the trial may proceed. Players accomplish this by comparing statements from two different jurors that contradict or otherwise prove strongly relevant to each other. This sometimes requires the player to press each juror and present evidence in order to change their statement.

Premise

Setting and characters

Taking place near the end of the 19th century and the dawn of the 20th century (known in Japan as the Meiji Period, in Britain as the Victorian era), The Great Ace Attorney focuses on Ryunosuke Naruhodo, a student at Imperial Yumei University and an ancestor of primary Ace Attorney series protagonist Phoenix Wright. He is described as a character with a strong sense of justice, but who easily ends up in danger. Joining Ryunosuke is Kazuma Asogi, his friend from university who studies law. The concept of defense lawyers was merely "years old" in the judicial system at the time in Japan, so Asogi is qualified to stand in court already, and aims to transform the legal system via study in Great Britain. Ryunosuke and Asogi are aided by Susato Mikotoba, a judicial assistant. She is described as being an "ideal Japanese woman", and is also a progressive dreamer, and a lover of foreign mystery novels.

Upon traveling to England to further his studies, Ryunosuke meets and befriends world-famous British detective Herlock Sholmes (named "Sherlock Holmes" in the original Japanese release). Herlock is a very eccentric and free-spirited individual. Despite being genuinely intelligent, the rapid-fire, blasé nature of his abductive reasoning often leads Herlock to incorrect conclusions. Accompanying Sholmes is his assistant Iris Wilson (named "Iris Watson" in the original Japanese release), a ten-year-old prodigy and Sholmes' adoptive daughter. Iris is a genius inventor, and the author of "The Adventures of Herlock Sholmes".

Plot
In Japan, Ryunosuke Naruhodo is put on trial for the murder of a Japanese university teacher, Dr. John H. Wilson. He is represented by Kazuma Asogi, while the prosecutor is Taketsuchi Auchi (the Meiji Period ancestor of recurring character Winston Payne). With help from Susato Mikotoba, Ryunosuke and Asogi prove that the real murderer is Jezaille Brett, an English exchange student who had been studying under Wilson at the university. Her motive is left a mystery; she is to be sent to China and tried in a consular court. Following the trial, Asogi leaves Japan to complete his studies in Great Britain, but hides Ryunosuke in his baggage so he can see Asogi's debut in the courts. However, while Ryunosuke is asleep, Asogi is found murdered within his cabin, and the now exposed stowaway Ryunosuke is once again blamed for the murder. Working with Susato and eccentric passenger Herlock Sholmes, Ryunosuke discovers that the real killer is Nikolina Pavlova, a world-famous Russian ballerina who fled Russia. She had unintentionally killed Asogi by pushing and breaking his neck on his bed's wooden knob after fearfully assuming that he was going to turn her in to the captain; in truth, he was attempting to introduce her to fellow stowaway Ryunosuke as an act of trust. After the incident is settled, Ryunosuke persuades Susato to let him take Asogi's place as a representative lawyer in Britain. She agrees, and begins to heavily tutor him on English law for the remainder of the journey.

Shortly after their arrival in Great Britain, Lord Chief Justice Mael Stronghart suddenly assigns Ryunosuke and Susato to defend philanthropist Magnus McGilded, who has been accused of murdering bricklayer Mason Milverton within a moving omnibus. They go up against Barok van Zieks, a legendary British prosecutor known as the "Reaper of the Old Bailey" and are introduced to the British legal system, which uses a jury of six people to decide the verdict. During the trial, a smoke bomb is set off, forcing an evacuation of the courtroom. After court resumes, Ryunosuke and Susato cross examine the newly discovered witness, Gina Lestrade, and discover evidence proving that Mason had been killed on the carriage roof, though van Zieks claims that this evidence had been forged after the smoke bomb had gone off. He is unable to prove this, and McGilded is subsequently acquitted, though Ryunosuke remains unsure of McGilded's innocence. Shortly after the trial, McGilded is killed in a fire.

The following day, Ryunosuke and Susato take on the defense of the soon to be famous Japanese novelist Soseki Natsume, who is currently in London studying English as a nervous exchange student, and has been charged with aggravated assault following a stabbing in the street. During the trial, Ryunosuke proves that the stabbing was actually the result of a domestic disturbance between landlord John Garrideb and his wife Joan, who had thrown a knife at her husband, only for the knife to fall outside their window and unintentionally hit the victim. Soseki is declared not guilty and explains that he is going to go back to Japan, no longer as nervous of the public as he was before. Herlock invites Ryunosuke and Susato to live with him and Iris at 221B Baker Street and set up their law office in their attic. A few months later, Gina is accused of murdering pawnshop owner Pop Windibank. During the trial, it is revealed that McGilded actually was Mason Milverton's murderer, and that the fire that killed McGilded was started by Milverton's son, a telegraph station technician named Ashley Graydon. Graydon and an unwitting Milverton had been selling coded government secrets to McGilded, which resulted in a fight that led to McGilded murdering Milverton; in revenge, Graydon killed McGilded and tried to steal back the encoded secrets from Windibank's pawnshop, causing him to murder Windibank in a confrontation. After the case is solved, Susato returns to Japan after learning that her father Yujin is supposedly deathly ill.

Development

The Great Ace Attorney was developed by Capcom for the Nintendo 3DS. It was directed by Shu Takumi and produced by Shintaro Kojima, and features character designs and art direction by Kazuya Nuri and music by Yasumasa Kitagawa and Hiromitsu Maeba.

Development began in 2013, a few months after the Japanese release of Takumi's previous project, Professor Layton vs. Phoenix Wright: Ace Attorney, when he was asked to work on a new Ace Attorney game. At one point, he considered having the game focus on civil trials, but remembered a game idea he had come up with earlier: around 2000, he had the idea of a mystery game in which a detective makes incorrect deductions, and where players have to correct the detective and lead him towards the truth. He thought it would be fun to combine the idea with Ace Attorney, but did not expect Capcom to accept the idea.

Takumi had also been wanting to make a Sherlock Holmes game for a long time; because of this, Holmes was part of the concept all the way from the start. According to Takumi, he had several reasons for wanting Holmes in the game: both due to the gameplay, and as a way to separate the game from the main Ace Attorney series, as Holmes is from a different time period than the one the main series games take place in. This led to Takumi thinking about how Japan was at that time, and lead to new possibilities for the game's mysteries. Initially, Takumi had intended for the game to begin in London, thinking that it would be too much to create a Japanese court only for the prologue; this changed when Nuri said that he thought it should begin in Japan. The previous work in Professor Layton vs. Phoenix Wright: Ace Attorney helped Takumi establish the details for this setting.

Takumi found it challenging to write dialogue and using expressions appropriate for the way the Japanese language was during the Meiji period, as he had to avoid both too old-fashioned and too modern dialogue. As the Meiji period was a time when the lawyer profession was new in Japan, and when there was a lot of focus on becoming a part of "the new world" and becoming more Western, Takumi made sure to make the game reflect this. As Takumi had to create a new world for the story to take place in, it took longer than expected to write the game's scenario. The protagonist Ryūnosuke's character was based on how the main series protagonist Phoenix Wright would speak and act if he had lived during the Meiji period. When the development team wrote a list of ideas for names for the protagonist, "Ryūnosuke" was the first one to be suggested; it only took a few seconds for them to decide on it. Susato is based on the same concept as that of previous Ace Attorney heroines: she was designed to be a "perfect partner" and fun to spend time with, as the heroines of the series always are by the main characters' side. Her name was decided by choosing kanji characters that Takumi found pretty. The development team decided to change "Sherlock's Watson" from the original, as they thought it would be more interesting if Watson weren't another English gentleman.

Visuals and music
Unlike previous Ace Attorney games, both characters and environments are fully made in 3D. Like Takumi's earlier game Ghost Trick: Phantom Detective, spotlights light up characters while they dance; this was something that had not been done in previous Ace Attorney games. Motion capture of the former Takarazuka Revue actress Shiotsuki Shuu was used for some animations; as the Ace Attorney series is known for its poses and animations, this was chosen as a way to make the animation more dynamic. Nuri designed the characters to make them look simple while also conveying a lot of information. He intended to make the graphics look like illustrations, and wanted to convey the feeling of the materials clothes and items from the Meiji period were made from. Characters were designed to be partially realistic, as realistic animations and facial expressions were needed for the game. Witnesses and jury members were however designed in a more stylized way, to ensure that players immediately recognize them when they see the characters sitting next to each other.

Ryūnosuke was designed to have "the sharp look of a university student", which went without problems. It did, however, take a long time to design his haircut; Takumi wanted the haircut to be recognizable from Ryūnosuke's silhouette, but said that most people during the Meiji period had simple haircuts. Nuri tried designing various haircuts from that time, and designed around 50 variations. Susato was designed to be an elegant Japanese woman; because of the time period, it was decided that she was to wear a kimono. Takumi had several ideas for various items she could hold, but it was decided that it was best to keep her design simple, as contrast to the English characters. Several different variations were made for Holmes' design, including "depressed", "cute", "adventurous", "dark", and "sleeping" variations; eventually, they used a variation on how Holmes traditionally is depicted, as contrast to his personality. Additionally, he was given a gun as contrast to Ryūnosuke's sword. Iris' design included gothic elements, as well as elements of a mad scientist, and was created to look good when appearing together with Holmes. Asōgi's clothes were designed with influences from both Japanese and Western cultures. His headband, which flutters in the wind, was something Nuri really wanted in the game, and was something they were only able to do with 3D graphics. Van Zieks was designed to give off a "dark aura", with elements of vampires, wolves, and fallen angels. The game features 2D animated cutscenes produced by animation studio J.C. Staff.

When composing the game's music, Kitagawa used a mindset similar to that when composing for older games, trying to work within limitations to create strong music. He focused on creating catchy melodies, and went through a lot of trial and error. Takumi wanted the music to sound more "festive" than the electronic music used in earlier Ace Attorney games, so he asked Kitagawa to make use of a live orchestra, but with fewer instruments than in the previous game. He also wanted it to sound British, so Kitagawa ended up using sounds similar to chamber music. They did not think piano sounded right for the game, which led to difficulties in differentiating the instruments, as they only had string and wind instruments; because of this, they ended up introducing Spanish elements to the music. As a reference to how Holmes is known for playing the violin, they also tried using violins in the music.

Localization 
Head localizer Janet Hsu approached the localization of The Great Ace Attorney Chronicles primarily "as a story", like all other Ace Attorney titles. For The Great Ace Attorney Chronicles in particular, there was also a need for historical and cultural background research on which to base the translation. They wanted to preserve the “period feel” of the setting. An example of these extra considerations is the Court Record subtitle system where, in an effort to preserve the flavor of the Meiji Japan setting, she asked the programmers to create a new UI system with which she could add subtitles to pieces of evidence instead of redoing the textures in English.

Regarding Japanese cultural nuances, not a lot was altered. This was because the game distinctly relied in the contrast between the cultures of Japan and Britain in its story and theming. As the player is expected to experience this culture clash in the first place, there was no need to change much. However some instances were "fine-tuned" regarding their phrasing, to help bring out the intended nuance of the original. Hsu gives the example of a scene involving Susato Mikotoba, in which she talks about a decision she has made. Hsu wanted to make sure western players understood that Susato is not being deferential or asking for permission, but is following Japanese etiquette. Hsu found it difficult to translate over the games numerous jokes and conversions that would not make sense to a western audience. For example, a conversation between Ryunosuke and Susato about a snowman involved them talking about how something is "two heads" or "three heads" high. This had to be changed, as it relied on players being aware of the culture surrounding daruma dolls and would not come across as funny in English. To maintain the feel of the original while altering such lines, Hsu considered what the Japanese version was going for and to either translate it over direct if possible, or go for its nearest approximation. In the original, dialogue consists of "faux-Meiji Era" style Japanese which is of the period, yet which is still easy to understand for modern audiences. To replicate this, the localization has the British characters speak in "faux-Victorian" dialect, such as the blue-collar Cockney accent of Gina Lestrade. 

The increase in awareness of Japanese culture in recent years allowed Hsu to include Japanese honorifics into the game without needing to explain what they mean. The usage of "-san" and "-sama" in contrast with "Mister" and "Miss" was utilised in order to subtly convey to players when Ryunosuke and Susato are supposed to be speaking Japanese to each other.

As the story and themes of The Great Ace Attorney are heavily tied to the protagonist being Japanese, Hsu felt it was important to convey his immigrant experience. The main struggle she faced was conveying cultural information to players in a way that feels natural. This was a stark contrast to past Ace Attorney localizations, in which the setting was altered to America. Hsu gives the comparison of "Turnabout Storyteller" from Spirit of Justice, in which rakugo played a major role. Hsu notes that, as the protagonist is localized to be American, having Japanese culture explained to her for the player's sake was easily doable and made sense. However, in contrast, it would seem entirely unnatural if Ryunosuke had to have Japanese culture explained to him. Thusly she needed to rely on slipping the information to the player naturally via context clues and indirect dialogue. Prior to announcement of the game's western localization, fears over the game's usage of racism directed toward Ryunosuke and other Japanese characters was one of the speculated reasons for the lack of a western release.

Conveying British culture to American audiences was also another hurdle that Hsu faced. There were issues involving the differing terminology between British-English and American-English, such as "first floor" meaning different things in both. The Japanese original also contained many references to Victorian-Britain that even the British translators did not know about, and had to look up. Hsu avoided using obscure Victorian Era-words or hardcore "Britishisms" that would’ve been confusing to people unfamiliar with the terms. Regarding the British setting, as the Japanese original takes great care to make the London setting feel real, Hsu avoided leaning on "American ideas of a stereotypical England", and instead focused on celebrating the culture of Britain. To this extent, most of the translators who worked on the game were British, and the translation was handed by Plus Alpha Translations.

The inclusion of real-life figure Soseki Natsume caused another hurdle for Hsu. As Natsume would be recognisable to all Japanese players, his books being required learning at school, the character relied a great deal on a natural cultural warmth towards him. It was difficult making the character as lovable to an audience who would likely not know who he is.

Due to long-standing copyright issues related to the character of Holmes with the estate of Sir Arthur Conan Doyle, the character of Sherlock was renamed "Herlock Sholmes" for the international release. This was done as an allusion to Maurice Leblanc's Arsène Lupin versus Herlock Sholmes, according to Takumi. Following the announcement of the "Herlock Sholmes" localisation, memes developed around the character and the circumstances of their renaming from "Sherlock Holmes" in conjunction with copyright law. This situation was picked up and covered by major online news outlets. Comic Book Resources lauded the "goofy moniker" of the character, complimenting its "fit with the comedic and sometimes irreverent tone of the Ace Attorney series, even if it does leave a few things lost in translation."

Release
The game was released by Capcom for the Nintendo 3DS in Japan on July 9, 2015. It was made available in various different editions. A limited edition, which is only sold through Capcom's "e-Capcom" store, includes the game, a box based on Holmes' briefcase, Holmes and Iris plush toys, a pin based on the one Ryuunosuke wears, postcards, and a Holmes-themed sticker. Another edition, also exclusive to e-Capcom, includes the game, a soundtrack CD, and a collection of illustrations. Additionally, there is one edition that includes the game and all the bonus items from the other editions. Pre-orders of the game also included a The Great Ace Attorney theme for the Nintendo 3DS home screen. A limited edition bundling The Great Ace Attorney with its sequel and a soundtrack CD with music from both games was released on August 3, 2017. The original soundtrack release was published by Capcom in Japan on July 15, 2015. Android and iOS versions of the game were released in Japan on August 30 and August 31, 2017, respectively.

According to Capcom France, there were no plans for a Western release of the game as of September 2015. According to producer Yasuyuki Makino, they wanted to release the game in Western regions, but knew proper localization would be a core challenge. In June 2016, Eshiro said that they want to release the game in the West, and that he is aware of fans asking Capcom for it, but that "certain circumstances" are preventing it from happening. A fan translation in the form of subtitled videos was created over the course of eight months and uploaded to YouTube; it was taken down by Capcom in June 2017, but reinstated by YouTube in July 2017 following a counter-notification by the translators. The videos have since been removed and the channel deleted, however. A complete English fan translation patch for the Nintendo 3DS and Android versions of the game was released in 2019, under the name The Great Ace Attorney: The Adventures of Ryuunosuke Naruhodou.

Reception

The Great Ace Attorney Chronicles received "generally favorable reviews" according to review aggregator Metacritic.

Kimberley Wallace of Game Informer considered the game "an entertaining package with two closely connected games that delight in their over-the-top fashion". Andrew King of GameSpot wrote that the story of the two games was "impressively cohesive", well written and with memorable characters, though a bit slow-paced, and also found the new "summation examination" mechanic incredibly funny. Ash Parrish of Kotaku praised the various additions that have been made to the gameplay, such as the Story Mode function or the new "Dances of Deductions", but also felt that the game was too long and slowly-paced, and that the racism the Japanese characters deal with in the story was "a little over the top". Kate Gray of Nintendo Life felt the localization work made for the western release was "fantastic", and also praised the soundtrack and the roster of characters, though lamenting the cast's small size and repetition. Malindy Hetfeld at Eurogamer noted that the game suffered from being compared to the original trilogy, but also stated that it tried something new both with the setting and the gameplay, praising Shu Takumi's writing. Graham Russel of Siliconera, while considering the game fun, stated that the core gameplay of the series needed more substantial updates, as the title played very similarly to its predecessors despite the presence of some new gimmicks. Eric Van Allen of Destructoid praised the deduction system and wrote that it "blend[ed] in naturally with the gameplay" and that it "emphasize[d] Naruhodo's growing ability to deduce and discover the truth..." Rachel Watts of PC Gamer scored the game a 73 of 100, praising the setting and atmosphere while writing that the hands-on deductions in the game contributed to a "missed feeling of showing up to court with a bag full of evidence" that this left "no sense of build-up to the trial." Patrick Lum of The Guardian called the game the "best game in the franchise," praising the "eccentric and entertaining witnesses" while calling its writing "truly sublime." Stephen Tailby of Push Square praised its gameplay, story, characters, setting, presentation, and bonus content, while criticizing its slow pacing and rudimentary new additions.

The game won VGMO's 2015 Scores of the Year award in the "Traditional / Acoustic" category; the music was described as exceeding the "already high expectations" for the series, and being streamlined and varied with "high-quality instrumentation and engaging melodies".

Entertainment Weekly placed The Great Ace Attorney Chronicles on the list of the Year's Best + Worst in the "Play" section for "Best Use of Vintage Copyright Avoidance", saying, "Herlock Sholmes is totally legally distinct from Sherlock Holmes. Just ask Arsène Lupin."

The Great Ace Attorney Chronicles was nominated for the Freedom Tower Award for Best Remake at New York Videogame Critics Circle's 11th Annual New York Game Awards, which went to Resident Evil 4 VR. The game won the award for Best Story in the Editors' Choice section, but was a runner-up for the same category in the Readers' Choice section at Adventure Gamers 2021 Aggie Awards; it was also a runner-up for Best Writing - Drama in the Editors' Choice section, for Best Graphics Design and Best Sound Effects in the Readers' Choice section, and for Best Music in the Editors' Choice section while winning the same category in Readers' Choice, and was a runner-up for Best Non-Traditional Adventure and Overall Best Adventure of 2021 in both Editors' and Readers' Choice. As of April 14, 2022, The Great Ace Attorney Chronicles has sold 500,000 units worldwide.

Sequel and compilation

In 2014, Takumi said that the game was planned to be the first title in a new series; A sequel, The Great Ace Attorney 2: Resolve, was announced in September 2016, and was released in Japan for the Nintendo 3DS on August 3, 2017, and for iOS and Android on April 24, 2018.

Capcom announced The Great Ace Attorney Chronicles, a bundle containing both Adventures and Resolve, in April 2021. It was released on July 27 in the West, and on July 29 in Japan and Asia, for the Nintendo Switch, PlayStation 4, and Windows via Steam. This version includes both English and Japanese audio tracks, an auto-advancing story mode, the downloadable episodes from Adventures and costumes from Resolve, and an in-game gallery for viewing artwork, trailers, and music with developer commentary. Players that purchased the compilation before September 1, 2021 received the "From the Vaults" downloadable content, which adds additional art and music to the gallery.

Notes

References

External links

2015 video games
Ace Attorney video games
Adventure games
Android (operating system) games
Capcom games
IOS games
Meiji period in fiction
Nintendo 3DS eShop games
Nintendo 3DS games
Nintendo Switch games
Nintendo Network games
PlayStation 4 games
Steampunk video games
Victorian era in popular culture
Video games based on Sherlock Holmes
Video games developed in Japan
Video games directed by Shu Takumi
Video games set in the 19th century
Video games set in England
Visual novels
Windows games
Racism in fiction
Video games set in the British Empire
Single-player video games